Chonghaejin Marine Company Ltd. or Cheonghaejin Marine Company Ltd. was a South Korean shipping company that operated the ferry MV Sewol, which sank en route from Incheon towards Jeju in 2014. The Sewol capsized in the Maenggol Channel carrying 476 people, mostly secondary school students from Danwon High School; 172 passengers and crew survived, while 304 were drowned or still missing.

Company
Chonghaejin Marine Company Ltd. was set up on 24 February 1999, and became a key entity to consolidate Yoo Byung-eun's bankrupt company Semo's shipping business, taking over ships and assets held by Semo Marine, and had Semo's debts written off. Yoo Byung-eun's two sons are controlling the shipping firm through a majority stake in the investment vehicle I-One-I Holdings as well as 13 unlisted affiliates which through a tangled web of ownership structure own each other. After Sewols sinking, the Ministry of Oceans and Fisheries cancelled Chonghaejin Marine's license to operate ferries on the Incheon-Jeju Island route in May 2014.

In mid June 2014, Chonhaiji Co. Ltd., a ship block maker controlled by the sons of businessman Yoo Byung-eun, and the major shareholder of Chonghaejin Marine Company with 39.4%, lodged its application for receivership at the Changwon District Court. Chonhaiji had  billion (~ million) in outstanding debt to main creditor Korea Development Bank. On 12 June 2014 a man's body was found in a field 415 kilometres south of Seoul. A few weeks later after forensic testing police revealed it was the body of Yoo Byung-eun. While foul play was ruled out, police said they had yet to establish the cause of death.

References 

Shipping companies of South Korea
Companies based in Seoul
Transport companies established in 1999
Transport companies disestablished in 2016
South Korean companies established in 1999
2016 disestablishments in South Korea
MV Sewol
Companies that have filed for bankruptcy in South Korea